Harmony was a ship built in the United States of America in 1794 that made one voyage for the British East India Company (EIC). She wrecked in 1804.

EIC voyage
Captain James Wickham sailed from Torbay on 8 January 1801, bound for Madras and Bengal. Harmony reached Tenerife on 24 January, and arrived at Madras on 17 June and Calcutta on 16 July. Returning home, she was at the Cape of Good Hope on 15 December, and arrived at the Downs on 21 February 1802.<ref>[http://searcharchives.bl.uk/IAMS_VU2:IAMS045-001115108 British Library: Harmony.]</ref>

Ambiguity
A key source on EIC vessels identifies Harmony as a vessel of 312 tons (bm), Rusk & Co., owner. Unfortunately, there were two vessels named Harmony, both built in the United States, both of about the same burthen, that were sailing at the same time, one with Wickham, master, and one with Wilkinson, master. Lloyd's Register for 1804 only reported one. The Register of Shipping for 1804 separated the two, but may have confused details between them.

Clarifying the issue will require a third, independent source, or original research.

Fate
On 13 December 1804 Harmony'', Wickham, master, was returning to London from Sumatra when she ran ashore at Deal. She was wrecked and only a small part of her cargo could be saved.

Citations and references
Citations

References

1794 ships
Ships built in the United States
Age of Sail merchant ships of the United States
Ships of the British East India Company
Maritime incidents in 1804
Shipwrecks of England